The R232 road is a regional road in Ireland which links Pettigo with Laghy in County Donegal. 

See also 

 Roads in Ireland
 National primary road
 National secondary road

References

External links 
 

Regional roads in the Republic of Ireland

Roads in County Donegal